In Christianity, postdenominationalism is the attitude that the Body of Christ extends to born again Christians in other denominations (including those who are non-denominational), and is not limited just to one's own religious group. Its focus on doctrine distinguishes it from ecumenism.

Many of the fastest growing Evangelical churches in the world do not belong to any "established" denomination, though the tendency is that over time the larger ones form their own organization (typically without calling it a "denomination").

According to David Barrett,, there are an additional 60 million Americans who are born again believers and do not attend any church. Though this is often due to faults in the church (some cite visionless leadership, unresolved sin issues amongst church bodies, lax morals in the pews, money mishandling, etc. in their reasons for not attending), postdenominationalists consider that the Church is at the center of God's plan for the world.

Common doctrinal points 

The following doctrinal points are shared by many who consider themselves postdenominational (Bible references in parentheses):

"Church" is the convocation, assembly, or congregation of persons, disciples of Christ, saved by faith (not by works nor by membership in a religion), regenerated by the working of the Holy Spirit, who obey the commandments of Jesus Christ and are His Body on Earth. (Ephesians 5:23)
The true Church, which is One, is composed of many congregations or local churches throughout the world. (I Corinthians 1:2; Acts 9:31, 15:41; 16:5; Romans 16:16)
The message of the true Church is always Christ-centered.
The true Church does not preach itself.
The true Church does not preach a person. (Acts 19:13-16)
The true Church does not preach a denomination. (Acts 5:42)
The true Church does not teach doctrines and traditions of humans. (Matthew 15:3-9; Mark 7:8; Colossians 2:8)
The true Church preaches only the Word of God, the Bible and preaches it in its totality. (Mark 2:2; 16:15; Romans 15:20; II Corinthians 4:5; I Thessalonians 2:9; II Timothy 4:2)
One should distrust anyone who adds to or takes away from the Word of God. (Revelation 22:18-19)
The true Church is the Body of Christ on Earth (I Corinthians 12:12-27; Ephesians 5:23, 29-30)
The members of a body do not choose their position in that body.
If a member becomes separated from the body that it is attached to, it will die, as it has no life in and of itself.  The body can continue to function, but with some limitation.
Where one part of the body is, the rest of the body is also. (Acts 10:24, 25)
The true Church is a group of people who know how to praise and worship God in Spirit and in truth. (John 4:23, 24; Acts 2:46, 47)
The true Church is a group of people who know how to pray. (Acts 2:42)
The true Church is a group of persons who love God and others. (I Corinthians 12:26; 13:2)

References 
 Patterson, Eric; Rybarczyk, Edmund J. The Future of Pentecostalism in the United States, Rowman & Littlefield, 2007,  

Ecclesiology
Evangelicalism